Rodriguezia sticta is a species of orchid endemic to Brazil (Espírito Santo, Minas Gerais, Rio de Janeiro).

References

External links 

sticta
Endemic orchids of Brazil
Orchids of Espírito Santo
Orchids of Minas Gerais
Plants described in 1839